The varieties of Bolivian maize are the result of thousands of years of selective breeding for superior agronomic and cooking traits.

Climate and soil diversity is a key feature of the landscape of Bolivia, a country extending between 9° to 22° South and 57° to 69° West. The indigenous cultures that played a key role in the differentiation of the native Bolivian maize races were the Aymara in the north, the Sauces in central Bolivia, and the Yampara in the south. Specifically, the Aymara adapted maize crop growth to the Lake Titicaca plateau, about 3,500-3,800 meters above sea level, a harsh environment, cold, arid, and windy.

Traditionally, maize is cropped in the following regions:
 Low tropics (200-900 masl)
 Subtropics (1,000–1,600 masl)
 Sub-Andean Chaco (200–1,500 masl)
 Inter-Andean slopes and valleys (1,700–3,000 masl, as far as the shore of Lake Titicaca at 3,800 masl)
Most maize harvested under 1,000 masl is cropped in commercial farms and used to feed livestock.

Use as food
Maize is a staple ingredient of traditional Bolivian cooking. It is used to prepare typical dishes such as;

 Api - hot drink for breakfast,
 Chaque & Lagua - soup,
 Chicha - alcoholic drink,
 Choclo - kernels boiled inside the ear leaves,
 Confituras - cooked popped kernels dressed with honey,
 Huminta - smashed milky kernels, seasoned and cooked inside the ear leaves,
 Mote - dry cooked kernels,
 Tostado or Palomitas de maíz - popcorn.

Different varieties of maize are used in diverse locally specific culinary recipes. For instance, purple maize can be used to produce a hot beverage called "Api" in the highlands and white maize can be used to make a cold beverage called "Somó" in the lowlands

History
Maize crossed from the Peruvian mountains into Bolivia about 3,000 BCE as a marginal food of the Andean peoples. Primitive maize, with small and popping kernels, and flint endosperm aligned in four distinct rows on the ear, later shifted to a decussate eight row alignment. Prior to the Incan rule of Bolivia, selection of the mean primitive ears with eight rows diversified and underwent qualitative specialization (kernel composition, consistency, shape and color), followed by the increase in the number of the rows. The key events of this process were;
 the increase in the ear size,
 the increase in the number of the kernels per ear,
 the increase in the number of the rows of kernels,
 the increase in the kernel size,
 the change in the kernel texture.

Later, selection was directed to link molecular markers (pigmentation) to the different kinds of present-day varieties. For instance;
 semi-flint kernel varieties are yellow,
 floury kernel varieties are white,
 soft texture kernel varieties are motley.

Maize from the "Morocho" and "Perla" varieties crossed the Andes mountain ridge and adapted to the lower altitude and different climates of Paraguay, Argentina, and the Brazilian lowlands, before the arrival of the Spaniards in the sixteenth century.

Contemporary classification

Since the mid-1970s, the Centro Fitotécnico y Ecogenético de Pairumani in Cochabamba collected and characterized over 1,500 maize samples. These were studied by environment, morphology, and cytological analysis of the chromosomes, resulting in the classification of 7 racial complexes, 45 races and hundreds of agro-ecotypes. These accessions are presently stored at the Pairumani germplasm bank.

On the basis of these and previous studies, Aureliano Brandolini and collaborators identified the following racial complexes and races of native maize;

A. Pisanckalla (Popcorn)
Popcorn kernels very small and hard. Grown everywhere. No change in flowering and ripening cycle when grown in temperate latitudes.
 Pasanckalla
 Pasanckalla
 Pasanckalla puca
 Pisankalla del valle
 Periquito
 Periquito rojo
 Pisanckalla
 Pura
 Pura
 Purito
 Purito
 Maíz purito
B. Valle alto (High valley)
Short and anthocyanic plants with very low ear insertion. Grown between 3,000-3,700 masl, in the Lake Titicaca plateau.
 Huaca songo
 Huanta songo
 Jampe tongo
 Jampe tongo
 Jampi tongo
 Paru
 Peru
 Pintado aiquileño
 Niñala
 Pintado
C. Harinoso del valle (Floury from the valley)
Medium to tall plants with usual red stalk. Size, shape (usually large) and color of the kernel greatly variable. Grown in the temperate valleys, 1,500-3,000 masl.
 Achuchema
 Achuchema
 Aisuma
 Aisuma
 Arrayan
 Azulino
 Amarillo harinoso de 8 hileras
 Amarillo cliceño
 Morocho corriente
 Ocho rayas
 Blanco yungueño
 Blanco yungueño
 Blanco de tostar
 Yunqueño
 Checchi o gris de tostar
 Gris de tostar
 Jancka sara
 Jancka sara tuero
 Puka checchi
 Chuspillo
 Chulpi
 Chulpi amarillo
 Chulpi blanco
 Chulpillo
 Concebideño
 Concebideño
 Huillcaparu breve
 Morocho Yamparáez
 Colorado
 Colorado
 Culli Entre ríos
 Culli Monteagudo
 Hualtaco
 Blanco aiquileño
 Blanco de Monteagudo
 Blanco pojo
 Yuraj sara
 Huillcaparu
 Huillcaparu
 Kajbia
 Kajbia
 Kajbia huata
 Kajbia tuero
 Kellu hillcaparu
 Kellu huillcaparu
 Amarillo
 Hillcaparu patillo
 Kulli
 Kulli
 Collpa culli
 Colorado potosino
 Culli
 Kulli chojnocollo
 Taimuro
 Oke
 Oke
D. Morocho (Dark)
Semi-flint or semi-dent kernels, yellow or orange, thin & hard external starch layer and floury internal layer. Grown in the temperate valleys and subtropical regions, 1,000-3,000 masl.

 Karapampa
 Karapampa chico
 Kellu o amarillo 8 surcos
 Chuchuquella
 Amarillo 8 surcos
 Morocho Aiquile
 Morocho de chuquisaca
 Morocho 8 surcos
 Tarijeño
 Tojmac kellu
 Morochillo de Tarija
 Kajeño
 Liqueneño
 Morocho de Tarija
 Morocho chaqueño
 Amarillo duro
 Morocho Colorado
 Morocho chico
 Amarillo 8 rayas
 Morocho Panti Pampa
 Morocho Tarijeñito
 Patillo
 Perla amarillo
 Morocho grande
 Morocho grande
 Amarillo huancaní
 Morocho Entre ríos
 Morocho 8 hileras
 Amarillo pojo
 Kara pampa pintado
 Morocho
 Morocho criollo
 Morocho Guadalupe
 Morocho puente
 Morocho tomina
 Suricha
 Turareña
 Morocho trigal
 E. Amazónico (Amazonian)
Tall and long cycle plants, with broad ears (Enano excepted), and joint floury or semi-flint kernels, large and brittle rachis. Grown in the Amazon and partially in the Chaco lowlands, 150-1,000 masl.

 Bayo
 Bayo
 Amarillo blando aiquileño
 Bayto
 Blando amazónico
 Blando amarillo
 Blando cruceño
 Amarillo cruceño
 Amarillo blando
 Blanco blando
 Blando
 Canario
 Aperlado sauci
 Duro amazónico
 Blanco aperlado
 Blanco duro
 Duro beniano
 Duro robore
 Enano
 Enano
 Perla pandino
 Perla pandino
 F. Perla (Pearl)
Mostly short cycle plant with white and round kernels. Grown in the valleys and plains.

 Aperlados
 Amarillo Tacacoma
 Aperlado
 Aperlado Tomina
 Blanco rosa
 Chake sara
 Chake sara
 Kjachichi
 Perla
 Perla
 Arrocillo perlita
 Grande
 Perla blanco
 Perla chuqui
 Perlas de los llanos
 Blanco perla
 Duro blanco
 Perlas de los valles
 Arrocillo
 Uchuquilla
 Uchuquilla de Quillacollo
 Uchuquilla potosino
 Perola
 Perola
 Arrocillo duro
 Blanco cruceño
 Blanco Roboré
 Blanco San José
 Perla amarillo
 Azucarillo
 Huerteño
 Perla mojo toro
 Santa Elena
G. Cordillera (Mountain range)
Grown in the transition zone between Chaco and the Andes meso-thermic valleys.

 Blanco mojo y Blanco camba
 Blanco mojo
 Blanco camba
 Cordillera
 Cordillera
 Argentino
 Tucumano
 Morochos de 14 hileras o Morocho camba
 Cordillera Colorado
 Duro
 Morocho camba
 Morocho cruceño
H. Razas de reciente introducción (Recently introduced races)
They include varieties such as Cubano amarillo, crossed with local races. Grown in the tropics and sub-tropics, 250-1,500 masl.

See also 
 Binomial nomenclature
 Ecuador maize varieties
 Geography of Bolivia
 International Maize and Wheat Improvement Center
 Shattering (agriculture)
 Subspecies

References

External links 
 International Maize and Wheat Improvement Center official site
  Fundación Simón I. Patiño

Agriculture in Bolivia
Maize varieties